A Foreign Field is a 1993 British made-for-television drama film about British and American Second World War veterans returning to the beaches of Normandy as old men. It is more a drama than a comedy, although it combines aspects of both. It was directed by Charles Sturridge and featured an ensemble cast of American, Australian, British, and French actors and actresses.  The title evokes the Rupert Brooke poem "The Soldier".

The film was driven into production by Alec Guinness who used his influence with the BBC to make it and with the various famous actors to appear in it. Writer Roy Clarke won much acclaim for A Foreign Field.

Plot
Cyril (McKern) and Waldo (Randolph), who are British and American, respectively, have both returned to France in search of the same woman (Moreau) with whom they each had a rendezvous in 1944 (unknown to the other). Cyril is accompanied by fellow veteran Amos (Guinness), while Waldo has his petty daughter Beverly (Chaplin) and her henpecked husband (Herrmann) in tow. Amos is childlike and carries an empty jam jar as if it is a favored toy. The two groups encounter one another, and after some conflict find common ground in old sorrows. Along the way they meet the recently widowed Lisa (Bacall), who has come in search of her brother's grave.

Eventually it is revealed that Amos saved Cyril's life during the battle of Normandy in 1944 but sustained a severe head-wound in the process. The wound has left Amos permanently brain-damaged and Cyril has been his carer ever since. Cyril also confides in the others that Amos does not have long left to live and this will be the last chance for the two men to come to Normandy to pay their respects to their close friend Briggs who was killed in action. Waldo has come to France for a similar reason, to visit the grave of a close buddy who was killed on D-Day. The trip helps put Beverly's problems into perspective. Lisa takes them to her brother's grave, revealing he was a German soldier. After a stunned pause, Angelique hugs Lisa, and then Amos gives a salute and marches off. The final scene is Briggs's grave on Omaha Beach. Amos has left his jamjar on Briggs's gravestone, and the group have filled it with wild flowers.

Cast
 Alec Guinness as Amos
 Leo McKern as Cyril
 Edward Herrmann as Ralph
 John Randolph as Waldo
 Geraldine Chaplin as Beverly
 Lauren Bacall as Lisa
 Jeanne Moreau as Angelique

Production
The film was shot entirely around the department of Calvados, in France.

References

Releases

A Foreign Field was released on DVD in 2018 by Simply Media.

External links
 

1993 films
1993 television films
1993 drama films
Films directed by Charles Sturridge
Films shot in France
BBC Film films
1990s British films
British drama television films